Federal elections were held in Switzerland on 29 October 1967. The Social Democratic Party remained the largest party in the National Council, winning 50 of the 200 seats.

Results

National Council

By constituency

Council of the States
In several cantons the members of the Council of the States were chosen by the cantonal parliaments.

References

Switzerland
1967 in Switzerland
Federal elections in Switzerland
Federal
Swiss